Leegstra is a Dutch surname. Notable people with the surname include:

 Ruurd Leegstra (1877–1933), Dutch rower and Olympian
 Tjerk Leegstra (1912–1980), American-Dutch field hockey player and Olympian

Dutch-language surnames